Green power or greenpower may refer to sustainable energy. The term may also refer to:

 Greenpower Education Trust, a U.K. charity
 GreenPower Motor Company
 Green Power, a Hong Kong NGO
 Green Power Forum, an English organisation
 Green Power Partnership, a program of the U.S. Environmental Protection Agency
 Enel Green Power, an Italian corporation